Neverwinter may refer to:

Neverwinter, a fictional city in the Forgotten Realms
Neverwinter (novel), a novel taking place in the city
Neverwinter (video game), a video game taking place in the city